Mufaro's Beautiful Daughters is a children's picture book published in 1987 by John Steptoe. The book won many awards for Steptoe's illustrations, and went on to be adapted into many different children's literature curricula. In the late 1980s, Weston Woods made a version of the book, narrated by Terry Alexander.

Summary 
Mufaro is a villager who lives with his two daughters, Nyasha and Manyara. The two sisters are opposites in many ways, as Nyasha is seen favorably by the villagers for her kindness while Manyara is bad tempered and bullies her sister whenever their father's back is turned. When they learn of the Great King's request for his citizens to send him any women they see as worthy of becoming his wife, their father chooses to send both of his daughters. Manyara goes first and along the way meets a hungry child, but refuses to offer him any food. She also comes across an old woman offering advice on how to progress past the laughing trees, but does not listen to them and hurries to the royal city. Conversely, when Nyasha leaves on her trek she chooses to feed the young boy and listens to the old woman. When she and her father arrive in the city they are met by her frightened sister. Manyara begs them not to go into the king's chambers, as there is a giant monster in there that recited her bad deeds and threatened to devour her, and Manyara is frightened that it will harm her sister. However, when Nyasha enters the chambers she is met by a harmless garden snake she had met while gardening earlier. He reveals himself as the king and states that he had shapeshifted during the journey in order to test the sisters' personalities and kindness. He chooses to marry Nyasha due to her kindness and beauty, making her the queen, while Manyara becomes Nyasha's servant.

Inspiration 
Steptoe derived his inspiration from the folktale, Kaffir Folk-lore, published by author G.M. Theal in 1895. Steptoe's illustrations reflect his time in studying an ancient city in Zimbabwe; the images of flowers and trees are exact replicas of the ones that lived during the reign of this unknown ancient city.

Characters 
 Mufaro (moo-FAR-oh): means “happy man” in Shona (native language of Steptoe); the father of Nyasha and Manyara; has some power in the village, but it is unclear the extent of it. He is a happy, good-natured man who loves his daughters. 

 Nyasha (née-AH-sha): means “mercy” in Shona; one of Mufaro's daughters; becomes queen at the end of the story. She is kind, caring and generous to everyone. 

 Manyara (mahn-YAR-ah): means “ashamed” in Shona; one of Mufaro's daughters; becomes servant at the end of the story; is arrogant, selfish and consistently mean to her sister, animals, and the other villagers

 Nyoka (née-YO-kah): means “snake” in Shona; is the king but we do not know that until the end of the story; the king shape-shifted into a snake (hence the name) to spy on the village women to decide which one is suitable to be his wife.

Awards

 The Caldecott Honor Book (1988): The Caldecott Medal is awarded annually to celebrate the achievement of picture book. Every year the Caldecott committee also cites other books as worthy of attention. These books are named Caldecott Honor Books and silver medals may be applied to those books. 

 Coretta Scott King Award for Illustrators (1988): The Coretta Scott King Award for Illustrators is awarded annually to one African American illustrator who demonstrates "appreciation of African American culture and universal human values".

Reception 
Mufaro's Beautiful Daughters was well received by critics, who celebrated it for having what they described as both positive messages and beautiful illustrations. It has been used in children's education in lesson plans about the need for generosity, black representation in children's books, and to serve as an example of descriptive people and settings. Additionally, it was used in a study of children's literacy. Lastly, due to its representation of minority culture and simple diction, it also is seen in many different curricula for teaching English as a second language.

References 

1987 children's books
Children's books about friendship
Animal tales
American picture books
Caldecott Honor-winning works